Hymenobacter swuensis  is a Gram-negative and non-motile bacterium from the genus of Hymenobacter which has been isolated from mountain soil.

References 

swuensis
Bacteria described in 2016